Gemma Lagioia (born 3 May 2001) is an Australian rules footballer who plays for Western Bulldogs in the AFL Women's (AFLW). It was revealed that Lagioia had signed a contract extension with the club on 16 June 2021, after playing 4 games for the club that season.

Lagioia is currently studying a Bachelor of Exercise and Sport Science at Deakin University.

Statistics
Statistics are correct to the end of the 2021 season.

|- style=background:#EAEAEA
| scope=row | 2020 ||  || 12
| 6 || 0 || 1 || 32 || 20 || 52 || 9 || 5 || 0.0 || 0.2 || 5.3 || 3.3 || 8.7 || 1.5 || 0.8 || 0
|-
| scope=row | 2021 ||  || 12
| 4 || 0 || 0 || 18 || 9 || 27 || 8 || 2 || 0.0 || 0.0 || 4.5 || 2.3 || 6.8 || 2.0 || 0.5 || 0
|- class=sortbottom
! colspan=3 | Career
! 10 !! 0 !! 1 !! 50 !! 29 !! 79 !! 17 !! 7 !! 0.0 !! 0.1 !! 5.0 !! 2.9 !! 7.9 !! 1.7 !! 0.7 !! 0
|}

References

External links

 

Living people
2001 births
Oakleigh Chargers players (NAB League Girls)
Western Bulldogs (AFLW) players
Australian rules footballers from Victoria (Australia)
Sportswomen from Victoria (Australia)